Merryland Studio is an Indian film studio based in Trivandrum, Kerala. It was the second film studio in Kerala, established in 1950 by former Trivandrum mayor and businessman P. Subramaniam. He produced 70 films, 59 of them directed by himself. He was active between 1951 – 1979. The studio's home productions were made under the company Neela Productions. Merryland Studio was famous for their professional rivalry with Kunchacko's Udaya Studio, the first film studio in Kerala. They resumed film production under the newly christened company Merryland Cinemas, debuting with Hridayam (2022).

History
When cinema became a passion, Subramaniam decided to buy some property to begin a studio complex. He bought land at Nemom, Thiruvananthapuram, and founded the studio in 1951, with two floors and a single camera. The first production, Atma Sakhi (1952), was given a lukewarm reception by viewers. It was the comedy film Avakashikal that put Merryland on the success chart. Mantravadi (1957)  was the first film that made Subramaniam a director. He went on to direct 59 films, out of the 69 films produced by Merryland. The list includes a string of landmark films of Malayalam cinema history.

In the 1950s, Malayalam film production were shuttling between Madras and Udaya Studio in Alappuzha. It was at that time Merryland Studio was set up at a five-and-a-half acres of land, easing the productions of Malayalam films. At its peak time, the studio used to employ close to 80 personnel. Many of the actors and actresses frequently appeared in Merryland films: Prem Nazir acted in at least 30 films in the first 10 years of his career, Sathyan was introduced in Merryland's debut film Atmasakhi, Madhu who appeared in many films was also a family friend of theirs, K. V. Shanthi was also known by the name "Merryland Shanthi" for her long-term association with the studio, the trio Travancore sisters also closely associated with the studio, Sharada also worked in many of the films. Others who were introduced through Neela Productions' films are Kottarakkara Sreedharan Nair, Miss Kumari, Vinodini Sasimohan, Srividya, Aranmula Ponnamma, S. P. Pillai among others. The competition between Udaya Studio and Merryland Studio was so intense that at one point when Merryland released Bhaktha Kuchela, Udaya released Krishna Kuchela with the same story, after that one they decided to stop the practice. Their Kumarasambhavam won the first Kerala State Film Award for Best Film when it was established in 1969. Merryland's films revolved around either social issues or mythology, they were mostly known for mythological films which were the most successful. Bhakta Kuchela, Sree Guruvayoorappan, Swami Ayyappan, and Sree Murukan were among their most successful mythological films.

Hridayathinte Nirangal was the last movie to come out of Merryland.  Subramaniam died in 1979, and it spelt the death knell of Merryland Studio as a powerhouse of Malayalam Cinema. In 2021, screenwriter John Paul wrote in an article that "The studios set up by P. Subramaniam and Kunchacko—Merryland and Udaya—respectively, led to the development of a full-fledged Malayalam film industry".

In 2022, Merryland Studios resumed film production under the newly christened company Merryland Cinemas, debuting with Hridayam (2022).

Films

Under Neela Productions
Aathmasakhi (1952)
Ponkathir (1953)
Balya Sakhi (1954)
Avakasi (1954)
C.I.D. (1955)
Aniyathi (1955)
Manthravadi (1956)
Padatha Painkili (1957)
Jailpully (1957)
Randidangazhi (1958)
Mariakutty (1958)
Aana Valarthiya Vanampadi (1959)
Poothali (1960)
Petraval Kanda Peruvazhvu (1960) [Tamil]
Christmas Rathri (1961)
Bhaktha Kuchela (1961)
Snehadeepam (1962)
Shree Rama Pattabhishekam (1962)
Snapaka Yohannan (1963)
Kalayum Kaminiyum (1963)
Atom Bomb (1964)
Althaara (1964)
Pattuthoovaala (1965)
Kaliyodum (1965)
Puthri (1966)
Priyathama (1966)
Kaattumallika (1966)
Hotel Highrange (1968)
Adhyapika (1968)
Urangatha Sundary (1969)
Kumara Sambhavam (1969)
Swapnangal (1970)
Kochaniyathi (1971)
Aana Valarthiya Vanampadiyude Makan (1971)
Sree Guruvayoorappan (1972)
Professor (1972)
Preethi (1972)
Swarga Puthri (1973)
Malai Naattu Mangai (1973) [Tamil]
Kaadu (1973)
Vandikkari (1974)
Devi Kanyakumari (1974)
Swami Ayyappan (1975)
Hiridhayam Oru Kshethram (1976)
Amba Ambika Ambalika (1976)
Vidarunna Mottugal (1977)
Sreemurukan (1977)
Rowdy Rajamma (1977)
Hridhayathinte Nirangal (1979)

Under Merryland Cinemas
Love Action Drama (2019)
Hridayam (2022)

Television
The following serials are produced by Karthikeyan and Murugan under the banner of Merryland, Sree Subramaniam Enterprises, Sree Saravana Enterprises and Sree Saran Creations.

References

Indian film studios
Film distributors of India
Film production companies of Kerala
Companies based in Thiruvananthapuram
Mass media companies established in 1951
Mass media companies disestablished in 1979
Indian companies disestablished in 1979
Indian companies established in 1951